Corning Glass Works v Brennan  417 US 188 (1974) is a US labor law case, concerning discrimination.

Facts
Brennan and others, who were employed at the Corning Glass Works, claimed unlawful discrimination because men worked on night shifts and were paid more, while women were only allowed to work on day shifts and were paid less. The employer argued that there was no unequal pay, because the jobs were different: the time of day when work was performed should be considered when determining if ‘working conditions’ were sufficiently similar. They argued this was a legitimate defense, that pay differences result from a seniority or merit system unrelated to sex under the Fair Labor Standards Act of 1938, 29 USC §206(d)(1).

Judgment
The Supreme Court held that although women plaintiffs worked at different times in the day, compared to male colleagues, the working conditions were "sufficiently similar" and the claim was allowed. ‘Working conditions’ means both ‘surroundings’ and ‘hazards’.

See also

US labor law

Notes

References

United States labor case law
United States employment discrimination case law
United States gender discrimination case law